Nove is an Italian general entertainment cable television channel owned by Warner Bros. Discovery EMEA. Originally known as Deejay TV, the channel was renamed and its logo redesigned on 22 February 2016. It offers programming aimed to appeal to the general audience and made available through Italian television LCN 9 ("nove" in Italian means "nine").

History
The channel was acquired by Discovery Italia following the agreement with Gruppo L'Espresso occurred January 22, 2015 for the sale to the latter of All Music S.p.A.
 
With the move to Discovery Italia, channel schedule changes radically, with the airing of programs and documentaries have been broadcast on DMAX, Real Time and Focus, films and some sporting events while keeping up in February 2016 the old name Deejay TV (of which L'Espresso Group maintains ownership of the brand) and the show Deejay Chiama Italia (still on the air).
 
On 9 September 2015 the channel undergoes a restyling and the new slogan is "In caso di noia premere 9". In particular, the new graphics are entirely focused on the number Nine, namely the LCN of the channel.
 
Since February 22, 2016 the channel changed its name to Nove (as already seen in the idents) making the old Deejay TV logo smaller and the web portal became nove.tv.

On October 26, 2018 the HD channel 509 was pulled from digital terrestrial leaving only the SD channel on its place which unlike the HD counterpart it only carries the single Italian audio the HD version still remains available on satellite in both Italian and English audio

Programming

Current programming

 1000 modi per morire (1000 Ways to Die)
 Alieni: Nuove rivelazioni (Unsealed Alien Files)
 American Horror Story
 Affari in valigia (Baggage Battles)
 Appuntamenti da incubo (Dates from Hell) Airport Security (Border Security: Australia's Front Line)
 Airport Security: Canada (Border Security: Canada's Front Line)
 Bad Dog! Chi diavolo ho sposato? (Who the (Bleep) Did I Marry?)
 Ci sei o ci fai? (World's Craziest Fools)
 Clio Makeup Come andrà a finire? (What Happened Next?) Come è fatto (How It's Made)
 Come è fatto il cibo (Food Factory)
 Crimini del cuore (Scorned: Love Kills)
 Destroyed in Seconds
 Deejay chiama Italia
 Disappeared
 Effetto rallenty (Time Warp)
 Flip That House Ghost Asylum Il mio gatto è indemoniato (My Cat from Hell)
 Incontri alieni (When Aliens Attack)
 Io e i miei parassiti (Monsters Inside Me)
 Jack on Tour Killer Karaoke LA Ink La grande notte della boxe La mia nuova casa sull'albero (Treehouse Masters) Lavori sporchi (Dirty Jobs)
 Law & Order
 L'isola di Adamo ed Eva (Adam Zkt. Eva)
 Malattie Misteriose (Mystery Diagnosis)
 Megalodonte: la leggenda degli abissi (Megalodon: The Monster Shark Lives)
 Milionario in incognito (The Secret Millionaire)
 Nudi e crudi (Naked and Afraid)
 Nudi a prima vista (Dating Naked)
 Paint Your Life
 Prigionieri di viaggio (Banged Up Abroad)
 Property Wars Sex ER: tutta colpa del sesso (Sex Sent Me to the ER)
 Sirene: il mistero svelato (Mermaids: The Body Found)
 Tabatha mani di forbice (Tabatha Takes Over)
 Te l'avevo detto (You Have Been Warned)
 Torte in corso con Renato Total Wipeout Unexplained Files''

References

Television channels in Italy
Italian-language television stations
Television channels and stations established in 2015
2015 establishments in Italy
Warner Bros. Discovery EMEA